Northland Country Club is a private country club in Duluth, Minnesota.  It was established in 1899. In 1927, Northland was renovated by golf course architect Donald J. Ross.  It features bent grass fairways and greens.

Scorecard

Recognition
Northland Country Club is recognized as #87 on Golfweek's 2010 top 100 classic courses list

See also
List of Donald Ross designed courses

References

External links

Golf clubs and courses in Minnesota
Golf clubs and courses designed by Donald Ross
Buildings and structures in Duluth, Minnesota
1899 establishments in Minnesota